Carl Georg Johannes Petersen (24 October 1860 – 11 May 1928) was a Danish marine biologist, especially fisheries biologist. He was the first to describe communities of benthic marine invertebrates and is often considered a founder of modern fisheries research. Especially he was the first to use the Mark and recapture method which he used to estimate the size of a Plaice population. The Lincoln-Petersen method (also known as the Petersen-Lincoln index)  is named after him and Frederick Charles Lincoln who first described the method in 1930.

Biography
C.G.J. Petersen studied natural history at the University of Copenhagen under professor Japetus Steenstrup. He participated in expeditions 1883-1886 and sampled the benthic fauna in Danish waters systematically. In 1889, he co-founded Dansk biologisk Station, which was a mobile laboratory in a former naval transport vessel that was put in a new location every spring and anchored for the summer. His research was primarily directed towards understanding the ecology – not the least feeding ecology – and distribution of fish species and to provide the fundament for an evidence-based fisheries policy. Nevertheless, today he is mainly remembered for his significant contribution to the development of the community concept for marine benthos.

Selected scientific works
Petersen, C.G.J. (ed.) Det videnskabelige Udbytte af Kanonbaaden "Hauchs" Togter i de Danske Have indenfor Skagen i Aarene 1883-1886. 5 bind og atlas, Kjøbenhavn, 1889-1893. 
 Petersen, C. G. J. (1896). "The Yearly Immigration of Young Plaice Into the Limfjord From the German Sea", Report of the Danish Biological Station (1895), 6, 5–84.

References

Further reading
 Spärck, R. (1932) C.G. Johannes Petersen, pp. 186–189 in: Meisen, V. Prominent Danish Scientists through the Ages (University Library of Copenhagen 450th Anniversary. Levin & Munksgaard, Copenhagen)

1860 births
1928 deaths
University of Copenhagen alumni
Danish ecologists
Danish marine biologists
Danish scientists